Born to Be Burned is a compilation album by the San Francisco garage rock and psychedelic rock band The Great Society. The album is made up of material recorded during the band's short-lived association with Autumn Records in 1965, with the majority of it  previously unreleased. The exceptions to this are the songs "Someone to Love" and "Free Advice" (tracks 1 and 2 on the album), which had both been issued as a single on Northbeach Records, a subsidiary of Autumn Records, in February 1966.

The album contains many of The Great Society's signature songs, including "Free Advice", a drone-laden piece of raga rock, greatly influenced by Indian classical music, and "Father Bruce", a song inspired by comedian and counterculture hero, Lenny Bruce. The oriental-sounding "Daydream-Nightmare-Love" and the darkly psychedelic "Born to Be Burned" are also included. "Someone to Love" is arguably The Great Society's most famous song, due to the later hit single version by Jefferson Airplane (retitled "Somebody to Love"). The Great Society's vocalist, Grace Slick, joined Jefferson Airplane in late 1966 and consequently she sings lead vocal on the Airplane's recording of the song, which became a Top 5 hit in the U.S. in May 1967.

Reception 

Released by Sundazed Records in 1995, Born to Be Burned garnered reasonable reviews, with most critics noting the power and confidence of Grace Slick's voice but also commenting on the relative lack of professionalism exhibited by the rest of the band.  Most reviewers noted that the album would predominantly be of interest to fans of Grace Slick and Jefferson Airplane or connoisseurs of the San Francisco Bay Area acid rock scene.  Many of the tracks found on Born to Be Burned were later included on the Big Beat Records' compilation album, Someone to Love: The Birth of the San Francisco Sound.

Track listing

Personnel 
 Darby Slick - guitar, backing vocals
 Grace Slick - vocals, guitar, recorder
 David Miner - vocals, guitar
 Jerry Slick - drums
 Bard Dupont - bass

Additional personnel 
 Produced by Sylvester Stewart and Leo de Gar Kulka
 Mixed and mastered by Bob Irwin and Chris Athens
 Original sessions engineered by John Haeny

References 

The Great Society (band) albums
1995 compilation albums
Albums produced by Sly Stone
Sundazed Records compilation albums